Robert Lam (4 April 1945 – 23 January 2010) was a Malaysian newscaster. He read primetime news bulletins for 23 years on three television stations. After he left his job as a newscaster, he set up his own English language center. The center was known as the Robert Lam English Language Center. The aim of the center was to promote the usage of the English language in view of the decline in the proficiency of the language in Malaysia.

Before he became a newscaster, Robert Lam was a pilot with the Royal Malayan Airforce (RMAF) where he miraculously survived a few plane crashes.

He died of metastatic melanoma at the University Malaya Medical Centre on 23 January 2010, aged 64.

References

1940s births
2010 deaths
Deaths from melanoma
Deaths from cancer in Malaysia
Malaysian journalists